Hasanak Dar (also Romanized as Ḩasanak Dar) is a village in Nesa Rural District, Asara District, Karaj County, Alborz Province, Iran. At the 2006 census, its population was 875, in 224 families.

References 

Populated places in Karaj County